The Sunday Football League Cup or the SFL Cup for abbreviation, is an association football cup competition held for clubs in the Sunday Football League in Lithuania. It is a knock-out competition with the final no replays, meaning each match will end with a winner and uses the penalty shootout.

References 

Football cup competitions in Lithuania